The Barakzai dynasty ("sons of Barak") also known as the Muhmmadzai Dynasty ruled modern day Afghanistan from 1823 to 1978 when the monarchy ended de jure under Musahiban Mohammed Zahir Shah and de facto under his cousin Sardar Mohammed Daoud Khan. The Barakzai dynasty was established by Dost Mohammad Khan after the Durrani dynasty of Ahmad Shah Durrani was removed from power.

Prior the seizing of the Durrani empire by the Barakzai dynasty, Loy Qandahar was captured by the Dil Brothers, Sardar Pur Dil Khan, Sardar Kohan Dil Khan, 
Sardar Sher Dil Khan, Sardar Mir Dil Khan, Sardar Rahim Dil Khan, in year 1818 and declared their independence, which lasted as an independent state until 1855, when Amir Dost Mohammad Khan unified Qandahar with Kabul.
At the start of Barakzai rule over Emirate of Kabul in March 1823, the Afghans lost their former stronghold of Peshawar Valley to the Sikh Khalsa Army of Ranjit Singh at the Battle of Nowshera. The Afghan forces in the battle were supported by Azim Khan, half-brother of Dost Mohammad Khan. During the Barakzai era, Afghanistan saw much of its territory lost to the British in the south and east, Persia in the west, and Russia in the north. There were also many conflicts within Afghanistan, including the three major Anglo-Afghan wars and the 1928–29 civil war.

History and background

Ancestrial background 
The Barakzai claim descent from the children of Israel in a direct line through the first Israeli King Saul, whose family intermarried with the family of his successor King David. King Saul's grandson the Prince (Malak) Afghana was grown up by King Solomon, acting as his commander in chief and Manager in the construction of the Temple Mount. However Prince Afghana sought refuge in a place called "Takht-e-Sulaiman", where he settled as Exil Arch. A direct descendant of Prince Afghana in the 37th generation called Qais heard of the message of the Islamic prophet Muhammad and visited him in Medinah. Qais regarded Muhammad as the awaited Moschiach and embraced Islam under him. He changed his name Qais to Abdul Rashid Pathan and married a daughter of Khalid bin Walid.

Qais Abdur Rashid's descendant Sulaiman, also known as "Zirak Khan" is regarded as the forefather of the Durrani Pashtuns to whom the Barakzai also belonged, next to the Popalzai and Alakozai. It is through Sulaiman's son Barak, that the Barakzai derive their name from, because Barakzai means "children of Barak".

Naming Afghanistan 
It was in honor of their ancestor Prince Afghana of Israel, whom some Muslims venerate as a Saint that the first Barakzai King Sultan Mohammed Khan and his brother Dost Mohammed Khan have named their Kingdom "Afghanistan", a fact some Afghans tried to hide because of International Antisemitic Sentiments that were present in the late 19th century, reaching its peak in World War II in the form of Fascism.

Political background 
The Barakzai dynasty was the line of rulers in Afghanistan in the 19th and 20th centuries. Following the fall of the Durrani Empire in 1823, chaos reigned in the domains of Ahmad Shah Durrani's Afghan Empire as various sons of Timur Shah struggled for supremacy. The Afghan Empire ceased to exist as a single nation state, disintegrating for a brief time into a fragmented collection of small units. Dost Mohammad Khan gained preeminence alongside his brother, Sultan Mohammad Khan in 1823. Dost Mohammad Khan would found the Barakzai dynasty in about 1837. Thereafter, his descendants ruled in direct succession until 1929, when King Amanullah Khan abdicated and his cousin Mohammed Nadir Shah was elected king. The most prominent & powerful sub-clan of the Barakzai Pashtun tribe is the Mohammadzai, of which the 1823–1973 Afghanistan ruling dynasty comes.

Mohammadzai

Mohammadzai are the most prominent & powerful sub-tribe of Barakzai, they belong to the branch of the Durrani confederacy, and are primarily centered around Kandahar. They can also be found in other provinces throughout Afghanistan as well across the border in the Pakistan's Balochistan Province.

Payendah Khel are descendants of Payendah Khan, head of the Mohammadzai branch of the Barakzai tribe during the reigns of Timur Shah Durrani and Zaman Shah Durrani, who became rulers of Afghanistan with the decline of the Sadduzai. Popular Payindah Khel are the Tarzis, to which King Amanullah Khan's consort Queen Soraya Tarzi belonged.

Musahiban or Telai are the descendants of Sultan Mohammad Khan "Telai", ruler of Peshawar, brother of Dost Muhammad Khan. The family of Nadir and Zahir Shah were closely related to Amanullah Khan through marriages. Another Telai branch that had immense power in Afghanistan's military was that of His Royal Highness Sardar Abdul Aziz Khan Telai and his children. Prince Abdul Aziz Telai was son of the Afghan King HM Sultan Mohammed Khan Telai and acted as a Major General of the Afghan Army and Governor in Kandahar and Badakhshan. His eldest son was Prince Abdul Qayyum Khan, who acted as Governor of many central Afghan Provinces.  Prince Abdul Qayyum Khan's son was the UN ambassador Prince Abdul Khalek Khan Telai, whose descendants are the Dakik family. Another known son of Prince Abdul Aziz was General Sardar Amir Muhammad Khan, who sided with the British in an attempted coup d´état against Amanullah Khan in the third Anglo Afghan War, proclaiming the title Amir for himself. His son Assadullah, whose nickname was Sharza became a General in the US Air Force, representing Telai interests in Washington DC. Another well known son of Prince Abdul Aziz was Brigade General Sardar Abdul Ghafar Khan, who acted as Commander of the Personal Royal Brigade of his cousin King Nadir Shah. It was Prince Abdul Ghafar Khan who executed the Amanist Charkhi family, who plotted against his cousin HM King Nadir Shah. These executions made by Prince Abdul Ghaffar Khan led to Ghulam Nabi Khan Charkhi's daughter convincing a Hazara Amanist called Abdul Khaliq Hazaragi to take revenge for the Charkhi family's massacre and murder HM King Nadir Shah.

Dakik family or House of Hazrat Ishaan is an influential sub branch of the Telai who also claim descent from Muhammad and Ali ibn Abi Talib through the Afghan General and Sayyid ul Sadaat and head of the Cultural Heritage of Sayyid Mir Jan Sayyid Mir Muhammad Jan, considered as hereditary successor of Ali ibn Abi Talib through Hazrat Ishaan by his followers. It is a branch whose family had influence in the establishment of Pakistan. Emir Sultan Mohammed Khan's great-grandson Prince (Sardar) Abdul Khalek Khan Telai was a Sardar (Prince) by birth and religious devotee (Murid) of Sayyid Mir Muhammad Jan, marrying his daughter Sayyida Rahima. Prince Abdul Khalek served as Afghan Ambassador to the United Nations under his second cousin Zahir Shah's rule and Chief of Staff under his second cousin Daoud Khan's presidency and is considered as the "Afghan Pioneer of Natural Science" as first Afghan Professor of Physics.  His grandson Prince Sayyid Raphael Dakik (b.1998) is an International Lawyer, Diplomat and professional Lobbyist with significant influence in the Pakistani Oligarchy as a religious leader, honored as "Sajjada Nasheen" of Ali ibn Abi Talib.

Shaghasi 
Shaghasi are the second most prominent & powerful sub-tribe of Barakzai, they belong to the Zirak branch of the Durrani confederacy, and are primarily centered around Kandahar. They can also be found in other provinces throughout central Afghanistan.

The transfer of Sadozai monarchy to Barakzai monarchy is an important political event in the modern history of Afghanistan. During this transfer of power, the role of certain individuals and families became very significant. At the time of seizing the city of Kandahar, the first man who climbed the Kandahar fort on a wooden ladder, and fought his way to open the fort gate from inside, was Mirdaad Khan Barakzai. After the transformation of the monarchy from Sadozai to Barakzai, and his landmark role in this transfer, the Kandahari Sardars (Sardar Sher Dil Khan) praised Mirdaad Khan Barakzai for his bravery and rewarded him with the title of Işik Aqasi (Minister of the Royal Court "Chemberlain"). From this time on, the Işik Aqasi title was, due to respect for Mirdaad Khan's royal services in Kandahar, shortened and localized to (Shaghasi) and Mirdaad Khan Barakzai's family became famous as the Shaghasi family and began to have a great deal of influence during the entire Barakzai dynasty from 1823 to 1978 as one of the prominent royal families of Afghanistan.

Shaghasi Khel are descendants of Mirdaad Khan Barakzai, Işik Aqasi (Minister of the Royal Court "Chemberlain") during the reign of the Kandahari Sardars (Dost Muhammad Khan's brothers), as well as the reign of Dost Muhammad Khan 1863 - 1866 and 1868 - 1879. His father, Bazar Khan Barakzai was a local Barakzai chief, and his grandfather was Sardar Yasin Khan Omar Khanzai (Barakzai), resident of Maruf District (at that time part of Arghistan District) of Kandahar, and one of the notable Sardars of Kandahar during the reigns of Timur Shah Durrani and brother to Muhammad of the Mohammadzai. The Shaghasi's were even more powerful than the Mohammadzai's during the ruling of Emir Sher Ali Khan - Emir of Afghanistan, and Emir Amanullah Khan - Emir of Afghanistan (February 28, 1919 – 1926), later King of Afghanistan (1926 - January 14, 1929). Prominent Afghan historian, Abdul Hai Habibi denotes that during King Amanullah Khan's reign, the former governor of Kabul was Mahmoud Khan Yawar and the later one was Ali Ahmad Khan (both Shaghasi) Barakzai. Abdul Aziz Khan (later Minister of war, and Prime Minister, Mohammad Sarwar Khan and Abdul Karim Khan were Naib -ul- Hukuma's  (all of them were Shaghasi) Barakzai. In Mazar-e-Sharif and Herat Abdul Karim and Mohammad Ibrahim Khan (later Minister) were also Khan Naib -ul- Hukuma's, and Abdul Rahman and Nik Mohammad Khan were Firqa Meshar (all of them were Shaghasi) Barakzai. Abdul Karim Khan in Paktya, and Dost Mahammad Khan Nazim (later Naib Salar, Sipah Salar, Dar-ul-Adalat, and Hakim-e-Ala) in Ghazni, Uruzgan and Kandahar were equally (Shaghasi) Barakzai, Mohammad Alam Khan in Lugar and Kuchi and other governors were the same. To the Shaghasi Khel is related  King Amanullah Khan's mother H.M. Queen Sarwar Sultana Begum, Siraj ul-Khwatin, the Aliya Hazrat (b. at Kabul, 1875; d. at Istanbul, Turkey, 1965), eldest daughter of Loinab Sher Dil Khan Shaghasi, by his third wife, Benazir Begum, a lady form the Popalzai clan.

Ali Ahmad Khan Shaghasi (1883–1929) who was declared Emir of Afghanistan twice in 1929 son of General H.E. Loinab Khushdil Khan, sometime Governor of Kabul and Kandahar, by his wife Sahira Begum, daughter of H.H. Amir al-Mumenin, Amir al-Kabir, Amir Dost Muhammad Khan, Amir of Afghanistan, by his wife, a daughter of Agha Muhammad Qizilbash was also Shaghasi Barakzai.  Ali Ahmad's sister, the Ulya Mukhadara Zarin Jan Begum was the mother of Humaira Begum who was the Queen consort of Afghanistan.

List of Barakzai rulers

Principality of Qandahar (1818-1855)

Emirate of Afghanistan (Emirate of Kabul 1823–1855)

Kingdom of Afghanistan (1926–1929)

Saqqawist Emirate and the 1928–1929 civil war

Kingdom of Afghanistan (restored; 1929–1973)

Republic of Afghanistan (1973-1978)

Heads of the House of Barakzai since 1973
Mohammed Daoud Khan As first president of Afghanistan, renouncing the title Shah after taking power (1973-1978)
Mohammed Zahir Shah (17 July 1978 - 23 July 2007) 
Crown Prince Sardar Ahmad Shah Khan (1964 Constitution of Afghanistan)

Languages

The principal language of the Barakzai is Pashto. Formerly, Persian was used as the language for records and correspondence; until the late nineteenth century tombstones were also inscribed in Persian. The language of the Barakzai tribes in Pishin, Quetta, Gulistan and Dukki (District. Loralai) is just like the language spoken in Kandahar. Those who have settled away from Pishin speak local languages (Pushto), such as Multani or Saraiki in Multan, Hindko in Hazara, Urdu in Bhopal and Sindhi in Sindh. Barakzai, a dialect of Pashto, is the language spoken by Harnai Barakzai.

Religion 
The Barakzai are adherents to the Sunni Sufi branch of Islam, following mostly the Hanafi school of Jurispudence and Maturidi school of theology. In the history Sardar Ata Mohammad Khan Barakzai, another brother of Sultan Mohammed Khan Telai, acting as Governor of Kashmir under Shah Shuja Durrani issued coins in honor of the Sufi Saint Nund Rishi and renovated his shrine. Some Barakzai including Dakik family are acting as Islamic Scholars following the Hanbali school of jurispudence and Athari school of Theology. Dakik family is known for practicing Sufism and venerating Saints as Grandmasters of the Qadiriyya Naqshbandiyya Sufi Order.

Custodianship of the Hazrat Ali Mazar
As Sufis the Barakzais are devotees of Muhammad's cousin and son in law Ali ibn Abi Talib, who according to Afghans is buried in Mazar Sharif. The Emirs and Kings acted as custodians of the "Hazrat Ali Mazar". Kings who are buried in the Hazrat Ali Shrine Complex are the following:
Dost Mohammed Khan
Wazir Akbar Khan
Sher Ali Khan

It is because of this emphasis made by the Barakzai that some claim that the Mosque in the Afghan Flag stands for the Hazrat Ali Mazar.

Anti-fundamentalism 

Although many Barakzai were practicing Muslims, integrating conservative Sharia Law in their legal system, they were known for their Anti-Fundamentalist policies, regarding them as politically motivated in the first line. Abdur Rahman Khan's Chief Justice and Naqib al Ashraf Sayyid Mir Fazlullah Agha (father of Sayyid Mir Muhammad Jan) contributed essentially to the definition of the conservative ratio legis of the Emirate of Afghanistan, that was later adopted in the Kingdom. Sayyid Mir Fazlullah Agha was especially supsicious towards Fundamentalist Shiite Movements, whom he regarded as fundamentalist proxies of the Shiite Qajar Dynasty. He was also credited for Anti-Corruption enforcement and rule of law in Afghanistan by forcing Abdur Rahman Khan to adhere to the Law despite being a King. Under Prince Daoud Khan's regime, Fundamentalists were regarded as political enemies of the regime, being suppressed next to Communists. The Muslim Brotherhood in particular to which later leaders of the Northern Alliance like Sayyaf, Hekmatyar and Rabbani belonged to attempted to destabilize Afghanistan and tried to assassinate Prince Daoud Khan and were thus regarded as a terrorist organization.

Royal standards

National flags

Coat of arms

Private Standards

Current role 
After the fall of the Taliban in the year 2001, negotiations about the re-establishment of the Kingdom of Afghanistan were held, including negotiations about the re-installation of His Majesty Zahir Shah as Shah. However, pressure from the side of Ethnic Tajiks who threatened to revolt against Zahir Shah and pressure from the government of Pakistan on the question of the Durand Line, forced Zahir Shah to renounce his claim to the throne, he accepted the title of "Baba-e-millat"(engl. Father of the Nation), which weakened his political role.

See also 
History of Afghanistan
History of the Jews in Afghanistan
Bani Isra'il
Barakzai
Mohammadzai
Shaghasi
Theories of Pashtun origin
Pashtunistan
Pashtunization
Dakik Family
Pakthas
European influence in Afghanistan
Anglo-Afghan War
Loya jirga – "grand jirga", a large congress called to discuss a particularly important event
Meshrano Jirga – "elders' jirga", the upper house of the Afghan legislature

References

External links
Khyber.org: Encyclopaedia Iranica − Barakzai Dynasty

 
Former monarchies of Asia
Modern history of Afghanistan
Pashtun dynasties
Sunni dynasties
Heads of state of Afghanistan
.
Emirate of Afghanistan
.
Kingdom of Afghanistan
Afghan culture
Pashtun culture
Durrani Pashtun tribes
Sarbani Pashtun tribes
Groups claiming Israelite descent
Surnames
.
.
1823 establishments in Afghanistan
1973 disestablishments in Afghanistan